

 
Hugh is a locality in the Northern Territory located about  south of the territory capital of Darwin.

The locality consists of the following land from north to south – the Owen Springs, the Orange Creek and the Maryvale pastoral leases.

The locality’s boundaries and name were gazetted on 4 April 2007. It is named after the river which flows through the locality and which was named as a creek by John McDouall Stuart in 1860 after a Hugh Chambers. It fully surrounds the community of Titjikala.

The 2016 Australian census which was conducted in August 2016 reports that Hugh had 865 people living within its boundaries of which 687 (78.9%) identified as “Aboriginal and/or Torres Strait Islander people.”

Hugh is located within the federal division of Lingiari, the territory electoral division of Namatjira and the local government area of the MacDonnell Region.

References

Populated places in the Northern Territory
MacDonnell Region